Insuloschema is a genus of moths in the family Gelechiidae. It contains the species Insuloschema barbarae, which is found in California, United States. The species is endemic to Santa Barbara Island.

References

Gnorimoschemini